is a Japanese comedian and impressionist most known for his impersonations of famous figures such as Beat Takeshi and Takanohana Kōji. He was also the original host of the hit comedy reality show Susume! Denpa Shonen. While originally making his obesity part of his jokes, Matsumura suffered a heart attack when he tried to run the Tokyo Marathon in 2009 as part of a TV show. He recovered and subsequently tried to maintain his weight.

See also
 Matsumura Kunihiro Den: Saikyō no Rekishi o Nurikaero!, a 1994 Super Famicom game featuring Kunihiro Matsumura

References

External links
 Official agency profile 

1967 births
Living people
People from Yamaguchi Prefecture
Japanese radio personalities
Japanese television personalities
Japanese impressionists (entertainers)